Douglas Fee (born 21 July 1944) was a member of the House of Commons of Canada from 1988 to 1993. His background was in education and human resources.

He was elected in the 1988 federal election at the Red Deer electoral district for the Progressive Conservative party. He served in the 34th Canadian Parliament but lost to Bob Mills of the Reform Party in the 1993 federal election.

After losing the 1993 seat, Fee became the CEO of the Canadian Angus Association in 1994. Under his leadership, the Association membership has doubled in number and registrations have almost tripled.

References

External links 
 

1944 births
Living people
Members of the House of Commons of Canada from Alberta
People from Kingston, Ontario
Progressive Conservative Party of Canada MPs
Canadian people of Irish descent